Oleksandr Tarasenko (born April 8, 1996) is a Ukrainian professional basketball player for the Kharkivski Sokoly.

Professional career

Born in Dnipro, Oleksandr Tarasenko began his basketball career in the Ukrainian Basketball SuperLeague, with the BC Dnipro in season 2016-2017.

Before season 2018-2019, he joined to the BC Zaporizhya.

In September 2019, Tarasenko signed with the Ukrainian Basketball SuperLeague team Kharkivski Sokoly for the 2019–2020 season.

References

1996 births
Living people
BC Dnipro players
BC Kharkivski Sokoly players
BC Zaporizhya players
Power forwards (basketball)
Ukrainian men's basketball players
Sportspeople from Dnipro